Nordic centre or Nordic center may refer to:

 Nordic agrarian parties, also known as the Nordic Centre parties, a set of political parties in Nordic countries which align themselves with centrism and farming
 Nordic Center Youth, a youth organization consisting of several such parties' youth organizations
 Nordic Centre in Shanghai, a joint project between Fudan University and several Nordic universities
 The Nordic Centre of Heritage Learning, a cultural heritage initiative